Saint-Jean-Chrysostome may refer to:
John Chrysostom, a Christian saint

Places
Saint-Jean-Chrysostome, Lévis, Quebec, a former municipality in the Canadian province of Quebec which now forms part of the city of Lévis
Saint-Jean-Chrysostome Aerodrome, an airport in the Canadian community of Saint-Jean-Chrysostome (in Lévis, Quebec)
Saint-Jean-Chrysostome, Montérégie, Quebec a former parish municipality in south-west Quebec which now forms part of the municipality of Saint-Chrysostome, Quebec